New Sounds in Swing (also released as Byers' Guide) is an album by jazz trumpeter Joe Newman and trombonist Billy Byers recorded in 1956 for the mail order Jazztone label.

Reception

Writing for AllMusic, Ken Dryden awarded the album four stars, noting "Byers wrote most of the music for the date and the solos remain very fresh. The performances are comparable to other musicians' better-known dates that have had the benefit of better promotion by their record labels and wider exposure through reissues".

Track listing
All compositions by Billy Byers except as indicated
 "Who's Cool?" – 6:18
 "Byers' Guide" – 3:56
 "Happiness Is Just a Thing Called Joe" (Harold Arlen, Yip Harburg) – 4:19
 "Fingernails on the Windowpane" – 4:09
 "April's Delight" (Judy Spencer) – 6:36
 "Gin and Catatonic" – 5:12
 "Dialogue in F" (Spencer) – 4:17
 "Tribute to the West" – 4:18
 "I Found a Million Dollar Baby" (Harry Warren, Mort Dixon, Billy Rose) – 2:24
 "Which One Is Sali" – 7:31

Personnel 
Joe Newman – trumpet
Billy Byers – trombone, arranger
Gene Quill – alto saxophone, clarinet
Lou Stein – piano
Milt Hinton – bass
Osie Johnson – drums

References 

1956 albums
Joe Newman (trumpeter) albums